Pseudomelanopa is a genus of harvestmen in the family Sclerosomatidae.  People used to think it is a monotypic genus.  After another species in the genus, P. liupan sp.nov., was found in 2009, it now has 2 species.

Species
 Pseudomelanopa liupan Zhang & Zhu, 2009 - China
 Pseudomelanopa taiwana Suzuki, 1974 - Taiwan

References

Harvestmen